Sernovodsky District (Ena-Xişkan khoşt; 2012-2019: Sunzhensky District) is an administrative and municipal district (raion), one of the fifteen in the Chechen Republic, Russia. It is located in the west of the republic. Its administrative center is the rural locality (a selo) of Sernovodskoye. Population:  20,108 (2002 Census). The population of Sernovodskoye accounts for 51.5% of the district's total population.

References

Notes

Sources

Districts of Chechnya